Grevillea aspleniifolia is a species of flowering plant in the family Proteaceae and is endemic to eastern New South Wales. It is a spreading shrub with linear to narrowly egg-shaped leaves and purplish flowers.

Description

Taxonomy
Grevillea aspleniifolia was first formally described in 1809 by Joseph Knight in On the cultivation of the plants belonging to the natural order of Proteeae. The specific epithet (aspleniifolia) means ''Asplenium-leaved".

Distribution and habitat
This grevillea grows in woodland on sandstone or shale in the catchments of the Warragamba Dam and Woronora River, and near Bungonia Caves, in eastern New South Wales.

Use in horticulture
Grevillea aspleniifolia is reported to be a hardy, fast-growing plant that tolerates heavy soil as long as the soil is well-drained. A sunny position is preferred.

References

aspleniifolia
Flora of New South Wales
Proteales of Australia
Garden plants of Australia
Plants described in 1809